Ruska Lozova is a village (selo) in Ukraine, in Kharkiv district of Kharkiv Oblast. It belongs to Derhachi urban hromada, one of the hromadas of Ukraine. , Ruska Lozova had a population of 5,016 people.

Geography 
The village is located near the source of the river . The village is surrounded by a large forest.

History 
Ruska Lozova was founded in 1647.

The village suffered as a result of the Holodomor from 1932 to 1933, during which 20 people in the village died.

Until 18 July 2020, Ruska Lozova belonged to Derhachi Raion. The raion was abolished in July 2020 as part of the administrative reform of Ukraine, which reduced the number of raions of Kharkiv Oblast to seven. The area of Derhachi Raion was merged into Kharkiv Raion.

2022 Russian invasion of Ukraine 

The suburb of Kharkiv was used during the occupation as a launch point by the Russian army firing at the city's civilian infrastructure. Ukrainian forces re-took the village from Russian troops on April 29, 2022.

Notable people 
 Ruslan Fomin, Ukrainian footballer

Gallery

References 

Villages in Kharkiv Raion
Commons category link is on Wikidata
Populated places established in 1647
Kharkovsky Uyezd